Benedict Joseph Zientara (February 14, 1918 – April 16, 1985) was a professional baseball infielder. He played all or part of four seasons in Major League Baseball (1941, 1946–48), playing mainly as a second baseman for the Cincinnati Reds.
 
A native of Chicago, Zientara was one of many major leaguers who saw his baseball career interrupted by a military stint during World War II. In parts of  four seasons, he was a .254 hitter (230-for-906) with two home runs and 49 RBI in 278 games, including 106 runs, 29 doubles, five triples, and five stolen bases.

Zientara died in 1985 in Lake Elsinore, California, at the age of 67. He was buried at the Riverside National Cemetery in Riverside, California.

References

Retrosheet
Baseball in Wartime

External links
 

"Benny" Zientara-stats and picture

1918 births
1985 deaths
American military personnel of World War II
Baseball players from California
Bassett Furnituremakers players
Burials at Riverside National Cemetery
Chicago Cubs scouts
Cincinnati Reds players
Cleveland Indians scouts
Dothan Browns players
Indianapolis Indians players
Major League Baseball second basemen
Mattoon Phillies players
Moultrie/Brunswick Phillies players
Olean Oilers managers
Syracuse Chiefs players
Baseball players from Chicago